Abel Smith (17 July 1788 – 23 February 1859) was a longtime British Member of Parliament.

He was the eighth child but eldest son of Samuel Smith, also a Member of Parliament, and Elizabeth Frances (née Turnor).

He was nephew of Robert Smith, 1st Baron Carrington. The family had grown wealthy through banking in Nottingham.

Abel Smith entered Parliament in 1810 as member for Malmesbury, and subsequently also represented Wendover and Midhurst, both pocket boroughs controlled by his uncle Lord Carrington, sitting in the Commons for 20 of the last 22 years before the Great Reform Act. He and his father were Wendover's last MPs, as they sat together as its members for the last two years before the borough's abolition.

Three years after the Reform Act, he was elected for Hertfordshire, and served another twelve years as its MP. He was High Sheriff of Hertfordshire in 1849.

Smith married Frances Anne Calvert, the daughter of General Sir Harry Calvert. Their son Abel Smith also became MP for Hertfordshire.

Notes

References

External links 
 

1788 births
1859 deaths
UK MPs 1807–1812
UK MPs 1812–1818
UK MPs 1820–1826
UK MPs 1826–1830
UK MPs 1830–1831
UK MPs 1831–1832
UK MPs 1835–1837
UK MPs 1837–1841
UK MPs 1841–1847
High Sheriffs of Hertfordshire
Tory MPs (pre-1834)
Conservative Party (UK) MPs for English constituencies
Abel
Members of the Parliament of the United Kingdom for Hertfordshire